Pareuchelus dautzenbergi is an extinct species of sea snail, a marine gastropod mollusk, in the family Liotiidae.

Distribution
This species occurs in France.

References

Liotiidae
Fossil taxa described in 2017